Giovanni delle Bande Nere was an Italian light cruiser of the , which served in the Regia Marina during World War II. She was named after the eponymous 16th-century condottiero and member of the Medici family. Her keel was laid down in 1928 at Cantieri Navali di Castellammare di Stabia, Castellammare di Stabia; she was launched on 27 April 1930, and her construction was completed in 1931. Unlike her three sisters, the finish and workmanship on the vessel were not rated highly. She was sunk on 1 April 1942 by the British submarine .

The Giussano type of cruiser sacrificed protection for high speed and weaponry, as a counter to new French large destroyers.

Service
Bande Neres service was entirely in the Mediterranean, initially as a precaution during the Spanish Civil War and afterwards in the Navy Ministry's Training Command. She did some mine-laying in the Sicilian Channel on 10 June and in July covered troop convoys to North Africa.

In the fight between the two Italian light cruisers and the Australian cruiser  with five British destroyers, the Allies sank Colleoni and damaged Bande Nere. Colleoni was disabled by a shell that penetrated to her engine room, allowing the destroyers to torpedo and sink her. Bande Nere scored a hit on Sydney and returned to Tripoli.

From December 1940 into 1941, she was assigned to the 4th Cruiser Division and covered several important troop convoys and attempts to interdict Malta. In June 1941, Bande Nere and  laid a defensive minefield off Tripoli which, in December, effectively destroyed the hitherto aggressive and successful British Force K; a cruiser and a destroyer were sunk and two more cruisers damaged. Further minelaying was done in July in the Sicilian Channel.

In 1942, Bande Nere continued to support Italian convoys and interdict British ones. The Italian operation K7 ran supplies from Messina and Corfu to Tripoli with heavy naval support and there was an attempt to block the British convoy MW10, which led to the Second Battle of Sirte on 22 March 1942. Bande Nere was part of the battleship 's flotilla. The Italian cruiser scored a hit on a British counterpart  during this engagement, damaging her after turrets. Other reports state that Cleopatras radar and radio installations were disabled.

On 23 March, Bande Nere was damaged in storms and, needing repairs, was sent to La Spezia on 1 April 1942. While en route, she was hit by two torpedoes from the submarine HMS Urge, broke in two and sank with the loss of 381 men.

During the war, Bande Nere participated in 15 missions: four interceptions, eight convoy escorts, and three mine layings, for an overall total of 35,000 miles.

1940
 7 July: Battle of Calabria
 19 July: Battle of Cape Spada

1941
 8 May: attack against Tiger convoy

1942
 21 February: operation K 7 (convoy escort to Libya)
 22 March: Second Battle of Sirte
 On the morning of 1 April 1942, Bande Nere left Messina for La Spezia, escorted by the destroyer  and the torpedo boat . Eleven miles from Stromboli, at 0900, the group was intercepted by the British submarine ; a torpedo broke the Bande Nere into two sections, and she sank quickly with the loss of 381 of the 772 men aboard.

Discovery
On 9 March 2019 it was reported that an Italian Navy minesweeper had discovered the wreck of Bande Nere. From photos shown, at least part of the cruiser lies on its port side in 1,400 meters of water.

Citations

References

External links 
 Italian light cruisers
 Giovanni delle Bande Nere Marina Militare website

 

Giussano-class cruisers
Ships built in Castellammare di Stabia
1930 ships
World War II cruisers of Italy
Ships sunk by British submarines
World War II shipwrecks in the Mediterranean Sea
Maritime incidents in April 1942